The Committee on Culture and Education (CULT) is a committee of the European Parliament.

Responsibilities of the committee 
This committee has focused on the well-being of all members of the human race and the increased opportunities for education in all countries of the European Union. The committee has 6 aspects of focus:
 looking at the cultural aspects of the European Union, in particular the safeguarding of cultural heritage, cultural exchange, and artistic creation of the nations in the European Union.
 looking at the Union's education policy, both in the school education systems, and in lifelong-learning programmes, such as museums and libraries.
developing an audiovisual policy and connecting this with educational information systems.
looking at the development of a sports and leisure policy with an additional youth policy.
looking to connect information with a media policy.
cooperation with third countries in the areas of culture and education and relations with the relevant international organisations and institutions.

In this current term, the Committee on Culture and Education has looked at three issues. The first issue is the protection of members of circuses in the European Union. The committee has declared these members of society as a recognized culture in the EU and desires the circus vocational schools to become accredited among other provisions. This resolution passed on July 12, 2005, with a vote of 29 in favor, 1 against, and 2 abstained.

The second dealt with the standardization of higher education systems through thorough internal assessments in accordance with the European Higher Education Area. Education also must promote diversity in its students and in the programs offered by the various institutions. It was adopted on August 30, 2005, with a vote of 24 in favor, 1 against, and 1 abstained.

The third issue has regarded the protection of minors. The committee has brought forth a resolution for the protection of minors in all areas of media, including magazines, newspapers, and the Internet. Among numerous other provisions, it will offer classes in safe usage of the Internet, and put forth harsher punishments for Internet criminal activities.

This committee, however, does not desire to diminish freedom of speech. This resolution was adopted on September 22, 2005, with a vote of 21 in favor and 1 against.

Parliament's activities 
The Parliament has made a point of trying to promote culture. It has hosted numerous cultural events, 150 took place in 2005, including art and concerts. Some exhibitions have been on the topics of breast cancer, the Srebrenica massacre and the Orange revolution. , is also gives the Lux Prize for European Cinema.

Members 
The CULT is made up of 61 members:

The major political groups are also represented on this committee including, the Party of European Socialists, the European People's Party, the European Conservatives and Reformists Group, the Alliance of Liberals and Democrats for Europe, the European United Left–Nordic Green Left, The Greens–European Free Alliance, and the Europe of Freedom and Direct Democracy Group. There are also three members that are not attached to any particular party.

Members 2014 
List of members for the 8th legislature

Chairpersons 
 Silvia Costa
 Andrea Bocskor
 Mircea Diaconu
 Helga Trüpel
 Michaela Šojdrová

Research service 
The committee is directly supported by a research service, the Policy Department for Structural & Cohesion Policies. Most of its research studies and briefings are published online. They do not necessarily reflect the view of the committee.

Recent publications (as of October 2018):

Mobility of artists and culture professionals – towards a European policy framework

Digital Skills in the 21st century

Education in Cultural Heritage

Creative Europe: Towards the Next Programme Generation

Europe for Citizens: Towards the Next Programme Generation

Erasmus+: Towards a New Programme Generation

ESIF and culture, education, youth & sport

Child safety online: definition of the problem

Solutions and policy dilemmas regarding minors’ protection online

Recommendations for EU policy developments on the protection of minors in the digital age

Migrant Education: Monitoring and Assessment

Why cultural work with refugees

EU funding for cultural work with refugees: current practice and lessons learned

EU funding for cultural work with refugees: towards the next programme generation

Modernisation of higher education

European Solidarity Corps and volunteering

The New Role of Public Libraries in Local Communities

Promoting Media and Information Literacy in Libraries

E-lending: Challenges and Opportunities

European Identity

References

External links 
 
 Research for CULT Committee
 Circus • Microsoft Word document
 Higher education • Microsoft Word document 
 Minor protection • Microsoft Word document

Culture